Stela is a puzzle adventure-platform video game developed and published by SkyBox Labs. It was released on 17 October 2019 for iOS and Xbox One and for Microsoft Windows and Nintendo Switch on 13 March 2020.The game was delisted from Steam on 20 January 2023.

Plot and gameplay
Stela revolves around a young woman that is witnessing the final days of a mysterious ancient world.

The environment can be manipulated in order to solve puzzles or go past dangerous creatures.

Reception 

Stela received a mixed rating of 71 on Metacritic for Xbox One, a 5 rating on Gamereactor, and 4.5 rating on TouchArcade.

References

External links
 

2019 video games
Adventure games
Indie video games
iOS games
Nintendo Switch games
Single-player video games
Video games developed in Canada
Windows games
Xbox One games
Dystopian video games
SkyBox Labs games